West Pawlet is an unincorporated village and census-designated place (CDP) in the town of Pawlet, Rutland County, Vermont, United States. As of the 2020 census, it had a population of 220, slightly more than the population of the village of Pawlet at the town center.

The CDP is in southwestern Rutland County, along the western border of the town, which is also the New York state line. Vermont Route 153 passes through the village, leading northeast  to Vermont Route 30 near North Pawlet and south  to Rupert.

West Pawlet is in the valley of the Indian River, a north-flowing tributary of the Mettawee River, which it joins at Granville. The rivers are part of the Lake Champlain watershed.

References 

Populated places in Rutland County, Vermont
Census-designated places in Rutland County, Vermont
Census-designated places in Vermont